Keith Sansom (born 6 May 1956) is a South African cricketer. He played in one List A and eight first-class matches from 1976/77 to 1983/84.

References

External links
 

1956 births
Living people
South African cricketers
Border cricketers
Eastern Province cricketers
Free State cricketers
Cricketers from East London, Eastern Cape